Martina Navratilova defeated Andrea Jaeger in the final, 7–6(8–6), 6–1 to win the women's singles tennis title at the 1982 French Open. It was her first French Open singles title and fourth major singles title overall.

Hana Mandlíková was the defending champion, but was defeated by Navratilova in the semifinals.

Seeds
The seeded players are listed below. Martina Navratilova is the champion; others show the round in which they were eliminated.

  Chris Evert (semifinals)
  Martina Navratilova (champion)
  Tracy Austin (quarterfinals)
  Andrea Jaeger (finalist)
  Hana Mandlíková (semifinals)
  Sylvia Hanika (second round)
  Mima Jaušovec (fourth round)
  Anne Smith (fourth round)
  Bettina Bunge (second round)
  Billie Jean King (third round)
  Virginia Ruzici (quarterfinals)
  Andrea Leand (fourth round)
 n/a
  Mary-Lou Piatek (second round)
  Kathy Rinaldi (fourth round)
  Pam Casale (fourth round)

Qualifying

Draw

Finals

Earlier rounds

Section 1

Section 2

Section 3

Section 4

Section 5

Section 6

Section 7

Section 8

References

External links
1982 French Open – Women's draws and results at the International Tennis Federation

Women's Singles
French Open by year – Women's singles
French Open - Women's Singles
1982 in women's tennis
1982 in French women's sport